Tolk is a municipality in the district of Schleswig-Flensburg, in Schleswig-Holstein, Germany. It is situated approximately 8 km northeast of Schleswig, and 26 km southeast of Flensburg.

Until 2007, Tolk was the seat of the Amt ("collective municipality") Tolk, which consisted of the following municipalities (population in 2005 between brackets):

Brodersby (520)
Goltoft (235)
Nübel (1381)
Schaalby (1700)
Taarstedt (895)
Tolk (2050)
Twedt (505)

References

Schleswig-Flensburg